Koffler is family name of:
 Andreas Wolfgang Koffler, Austrian Jesuit missionary at the court of Zhu Youlang
 Józef Koffler (1896–1944), Polish composer, musicologist and columnist
 Hanno Koffler (born 1980), German actor
 Leo Koffler (1879–1931), Austrian-German screenwriter, actor and singer
 Max Koffler (born 1978), German musician
 Murray Koffler (1924–2017), Canadian pharmacist and businessman
 Remus Koffler (1902–1954), Romanian communist activist and financier